is a former Japanese football player and manager. He managed the Japan women's national team.

Playing career
Ueda was born in Tateyama on December 22, 1953. After graduating from Aoyama Gakuin University, he played for Japan Soccer League club Fujita Industries (later, Bellmare Hiratsuka, Shonan Bellmare) from 1976 to 1982.

Coaching career
After retirement, Ueda became coach for Fujita Industries. In 1999, he became manager for Bellmare Hiratsuka. But in July, he resigned. From 2000, he became manager for the Macau national team until May 2002. On August 2002, he became manager for the Japan women's national team. He managed at the 2003 FIFA Women's World Cup and the 2004 Summer Olympics. After the 2004 Summer Olympics, he became manager for Shonan Bellmare again. He resigned in June 2006.

Managerial statistics

References

External links

profiles
Japan Football Association

1953 births
Living people
People from Tateyama, Chiba
Aoyama Gakuin University alumni
Association football people from Chiba Prefecture
Japanese footballers
Japan Soccer League players
Shonan Bellmare players
Association football forwards
Japanese football managers
J1 League managers
J2 League managers
Shonan Bellmare managers
Macau national football team managers
Japan women's national football team managers
Expatriate football managers in Macau
2003 FIFA Women's World Cup managers